Bruno Rizzi (March 20, 1901 – January 13, 1977) was an Italian unorthodox political theorist.

Early activities 
Bruno Rizzi was born on March 20, 1901, in Porto Mantovano.  In 1918, he joined the Italian Socialist Party but left in 1921 to be among the founders of the Communist Party of Italy (PCI) in 1921. He left the PCI in 1930.

Due to persecution by the Fascist regime, Rizzi emigrated to France. During the later 1930s, he intervened in the debates involving Leon Trotsky, James Burnham and Yvan Craipeau concerning the nature of the Soviet Union.

Writings on bureaucratic states and later life 
His most important work, La Bureaucratisation du Monde ("Bureaucratisation of the World"), was published in Paris in 1939, but most copies were seized by the French government. In it, he stated that Fascism and Stalinism were developing similar political methods. Trotsky thoroughly criticized Rizzi's conflation of Fascism and Stalinism as part of his polemic "In Defence of Marxism" which was written to oppose the positions of the Burnham-Shachtman minority in the US Socialist Workers Party.

It would be more than 30 years before an abridged version of Rizzi's work would be published in Italy. In the original text, he argued for common cause by the totalitarian regimes of Germany, Italy, and the Soviet Union: "The racist struggles of national socialism and fascism, fundamentally, are nothing but an anti-capitalist campaign led by a new social synthesis, theoretically erroneous but practically just", omitted from later editions. Following the fall of France in 1940, he published the pamphlet Écoute Citoyen! ("Listen, Citizen!"), in which he repeated these claims.

Rizzi returned to Italy in 1943, but withdrew to private life, working as a shoe salesman. He contributed irregularly to Critica Sociale, Tempi Moderni and Rassegna di Sociologia.

Death
Rizzi died age 75 on January 13, 1977, in Bussolengo.

See also 
 Bureaucratic collectivism

References

External links 
 Bruno Rizzi Archive

Rizzi, Bruno
Rizzi, Bruno
Rizzi, Bruno
Rizzi, Bruno
Rizzi, Bruno
Rizzi, Bruno
Rizzi, Bruno
Rizzi, Bruno
Rizzi, Bruno
Rizzi, Bruno
Rizzi, Bruno
Rizzi, Bruno
20th-century Italian historians
20th-century essayists
Italian male non-fiction writers
Politicians from the Province of Mantua